Naiman may refer to:

Naimans, group of people dwelling on the steppe of Central Asia
Naiman Banner, county in Inner Mongolia, China
Anatoly Naiman (born 1936), Russian poet, translator and writer
Robert Naiman (activist)
Robert J. Naiman (born 1947), professor at the University of Washington in Seattle
Naiman-Beg,  title that means "Prince of Naimans"

See also
Naaman (disambiguation)
Nyman, English and Swedish surname